Roundabout homolog 3 is a protein that in humans is encoded by the ROBO3 gene.

References

Further reading